Arthamuru is a village in Mandapeta mandal, located in East Godavari district of the Indian state of Andhra Pradesh.

References

Villages in East Godavari district